Learning theory may refer to:

Education 
 Learning theory (education), the process of how humans learn
 Connectivism
 Educational philosophies, an academic field that examines the definitions, goals and meaning of education, or of specific educational philosophies.
 Behaviorism (philosophy of education)
 Cognitivism (philosophy of education)
 Constructivism (philosophy of education)
 Humanism (philosophy of education)
 E-learning (theory), a cognitive science of effective multimedia e-learning
 Instructional theory
 Social cognitive theory
 Social learning theory

Computer science 
 Algorithmic learning theory, a branch of computational learning theory. Sometimes also referred to as algorithmic inductive inference.
 Computational learning theory, a mathematical theory to analyze machine learning algorithms.
 Online machine learning, the process of teaching a machine.
 Statistical learning theory